Cornelius Griffin (born December 3, 1976) is a former American football defensive tackle. He was drafted by the New York Giants in the second round of the 2000 NFL Draft. He played college football at Pearl River Community College and Alabama.

Griffin also played for the Washington Redskins.

Early life and college career
Griffin was born in Troy, Alabama. His father Willie Griffin was a pastor of the Lily White Pentecostal Church in Brundidge, Alabama, and Cornelius was one of Willie and Martha Griffin's seven children. Willie died in a car accident in 1998. Griffin graduated from Pike County High School in 1995 in Brundidge, Alabama. He first played college football as a defensive tackle for Pearl River Community College in Mississippi. Although he committed to Auburn, Griffin decided to sign with the University of Alabama after Auburn coaches wanted him to become a tight end. In the Alabama Crimson Tide, he started 23 of 25 games in its  team (including bowls). As a senior in 1999, he was part of the Super Sleeper Team and All-Southeastern Conference first-team.

Professional career

2000 NFL Draft
Griffin was selected in the second round of the 2000 NFL Draft by the New York Giants. "His workouts were unbelievable. We saw him as a certain first-rounder", said Giants General Manager Ernie Accorsi.

New York Giants
Griffin played for four seasons with the Giants. He was a starter in Super Bowl 35 and recorded 1.5 sacks in the game.

Washington Redskins
Griffin was signed by the Giants' NFC East-rival Washington Redskins as an unrestricted free agent on March 3, 2004, during the 2004 offseason.

Griffin had his best season in 2004, recording 96 tackles (66 solo) and six sacks.  He compiled 29 sacks with 461 tackles (340 solo) as a defensive tackle during his career.

He was released on March 4, 2010.

After the NFL
Griffin purchased a share of Flowers Insurance Company in Troy, Alabama.  The name has now been changed to Griffin-Wilkes Insurance. Griffin also coaches has coached at Pike Liberal Arts High School in Troy, Alabama. Although he currently coaches for the Pike County High School Bulldogs in Brundidge, Alabama which is also his hometown and hometown high school.

NFL statistics

References

External links

1976 births
Living people
People from Troy, Alabama
African-American players of American football
Alabama Crimson Tide football players
American football defensive tackles
New York Giants players
Pearl River Wildcats football players
Players of American football from Alabama
Washington Redskins players
21st-century African-American sportspeople
20th-century African-American sportspeople